The Serie B 1969–70 was the thirty-eighth tournament of this competition played in Italy since its creation.

Teams
Piacenza, Arezzo and Taranto had been promoted from Serie C, while Varese, Pisa and Atalanta had been relegated from Serie A.

Final classification

Results

References and sources
Almanacco Illustrato del Calcio - La Storia 1898-2004, Panini Edizioni, Modena, September 2005

Serie B seasons
2
Italy